The New South Wales Legislative Council, often referred to as the upper house, is one of the two chambers of the parliament of the Australian state of New South Wales. The other is the Legislative Assembly. Both sit at Parliament House in the state capital, Sydney. It is normal for legislation to be first deliberated on and passed by the Legislative Assembly before being considered by the Legislative Council, which acts in the main as a house of review.

The Legislative Council has 42 members, elected by proportional representation in which the whole state is a single electorate. Members serve eight-year terms, which are staggered, with half the Council being elected every four years, roughly coinciding with elections to the Legislative Assembly.

History
The parliament of New South Wales is Australia's oldest legislature. It had its beginnings when New South Wales was a British colony under the control of the Governor, and was first established by the New South Wales Act 1823. A small, 5-member appointed Legislative Council began meeting on 25 August 1824 to advise the Governor on legislative matters. It grew to seven members in 1825, and between ten and fifteen in 1829. Under the Constitution Act 1843, the Legislative Council was expanded to 36 members, of which 12 were appointed by the Governor in the name of the Crown, and the remainder elected from among eligible landholders. In 1851, the council was enlarged to 54 members with 36 of its members elected by adult males who met certain property requirements and 18 appointed members. 
In 1856, under a new Constitution, the Parliament became bicameral with a fully elected Legislative Assembly and a fully appointed Legislative Council with a Government taking over most of the legislative powers of the Governor. The right to vote was extended to all adult males in 1858.

On 22 May 1856, the newly constituted New South Wales Parliament opened and sat for the first time. With the new 54-member Legislative Assembly taking over the council chamber, a second meeting chamber for the 21-member upper house had to be added to the Parliament building in Macquarie Street. In 1901, New South Wales became a state of the Commonwealth of Australia and many government functions were transferred to the new Commonwealth government. In 1902, women gained the right to vote and the current Constitution of New South Wales was adopted, and in 1918, reforms permitted women to be members of parliament.

In 1925, 1926 and 1929, Premier Jack Lang made attempts to abolish the Legislative Council, following the example of the Queensland Legislative Council in 1922, but all were unsuccessful. The debate did, however, result in another round of reforms, and in 1933, the law was changed so that a quarter of the Legislative Council was elected every three years by members of the Legislative Assembly and the Legislative Council, rather than being appointed by the Governor. In 1962 Indigenous Australians gained the right to vote in all state elections. In 1978, the Council became a directly elected body in a program of electoral reform introduced by the Wran Labor government. The number of members was reduced to 45, although transitional arrangements meant that there were 43 members from 1978 to 1981, and 44 from 1981 to 1984. Further reform in 1991 by the Greiner Liberal-National government saw the size of the Legislative Council cut to 42 members, with half being elected every 4 years. In 1991, the Legislative Assembly reduced from 109 to 99 Members and then to 93 members in 1999.

As with the federal parliament and other Australian states and territories, voting in the election to select members for the council is compulsory for all New South Wales citizens over the age of 18. As the result of a 1995 referendum, every four years half the seats in the Council come up for election on the fourth Saturday in March, barring exceptional circumstances.

The King of Australia has a throne in the Legislative Council. Queen Elizabeth II opened the New South Wales Parliament on two occasions. The first was on 4 February 1954, as part of her first visit to Australia. It was the first time that the monarch of Australia had opened a session of any Australian parliament. The other occasion was on 20 February 1992, during her visit to Sydney to celebrate the sesquicentenary of the incorporation of the City of Sydney, on which occasion she stated:

Presidency of the Legislative Council

From 1846 to 1856 the title of the presiding officer was Speaker of the Legislative Council, and after that date it has been President of the Legislative Council.

Chamber

The Legislative Council chamber is a prefabricated cast-iron building, intended as an "iron store and dwelling with ornamental front", which had been manufactured in Scotland and shipped to Victoria. In 1856, when plans for a new chamber for the Legislative Council were not ready in time, this building was purchased and shipped to Sydney, where it was erected as an extension to Parliament House. The Legislative Council chamber is furnished in red, which follows the British tradition for the upper house.

Composition and powers
Proportional representation, with the whole state as a single electorate, means that the quota for election is small. This almost guarantees the representation of minor parties in the Legislative Council, including micro-parties that might attract less than 2% of the primary vote but are elected through preferences.

In the 1999 elections, a record number of parties contested seats in the council, resulting in an unwieldy ballot paper (referred to as the "table cloth" ballot paper), and a complex exchange of preferences between the numerous parties running candidates. As a result, party registration requirements have since been made more restrictive (e.g., requiring more voters as members, and a larger number of candidates to become eligible for a simple "above-the-line" voting box), and the replacement of party preference arrangements with optional preferential voting. This reduced the number of parties contesting elections and increased the difficulty for small, upstart parties to be elected, so that only five are now represented in the council (Shooters, Fishers and Farmers; Christian Democrats; the Greens; One Nation and the Animal Justice Party), along with Labor, Liberal, and National Party members.

Current distribution of seats (2019–2023)

The President of the Legislative Council has a casting vote should the result be equal from among those present eligible and choosing to vote. With 42 members, with one removed as president, a majority is 21 of the 41 possible of the whole 42.

Section 22I of the NSW Constitution states that "All questions arising in the Legislative Council shall be decided by a majority of the votes of the Members present other than the President or other Member presiding and when the votes are equal the President or other Member presiding shall have a casting vote."

See also 

 2019 New South Wales state election
 List of New South Wales Legislative Council appointments
 Parliaments of the Australian states and territories
 Women in the New South Wales Legislative Council
 Members of the New South Wales Legislative Council, 1823–1843

Notes

References

Further reading

External links
Official Website
 
 Australia's Upper Houses - ABC Rear Vision A podcast about the development of Australia's upper houses into STV proportional representation elected chambers.
 New South Wales Legislative Council Practice

 
Parliament of New South Wales
New South Wales
1823 establishments in Australia